The following is a list of recordings of the opera Les Huguenots, by Giacomo Meyerbeer (libretto by Eugène Scribe and Émile Deschamps), which was premiered in 1836. Performances are in the original French unless noted.


Recordings

Arias
Several late 19th-century singers versed in the genuine Meyerbeerian performance style made acoustic gramophone recordings of arias from Les Huguenots. Many of these early recordings have been remastered and reissued on CD recitals.

References

Opera discographies
Operas by Giacomo Meyerbeer